The New Bern Mall is a shopping mall located in New Bern, North Carolina that opened in 1979. Its anchors are Belk, T.J. Maxx and Sears Hometown.  The mall opened as Twin Rivers Mall, and also had a Kmart as an original anchor, which closed in 2002 and has been torn down. On June 4, 2020, it was announced that JCPenney would be closing at the mall, as part of a 154-store closing round.

References

External links

Buildings and structures in New Bern, North Carolina
Shopping malls in North Carolina
Shopping malls established in 1979
Hull Property Group